Cheryl Mitchell is an American plant food scientist who created the HydroRelease milling process. She is the chief scientist at Elmhurst Milked and the creator of a line of plant-based milks.

Mitchell started her career after getting her Ph.D. from Texas A&M University specializing in carbohydrate chemistry by developing Rice Dream rice milk for natural foods company Imagine Foods.  In 2001, she left Imagine Foods, bought a research facility in California and spent five years working for herself and developing a process for creating plant-based milk that equaled the protein level of dairy. Her HydroRelease milling process allows anyone to separate the natural component of a grain, nut or seed before reassembling them into a beverage.

In 2017, she partnered with Henry Schwartz, owner of Elmhurst Dairy, to bring her technology to market and create the plant-based beverage company Elmhurst 1925. She moved from California to Elma, New York to become the chief scientist of Elmhurst Milked and her first four plant-based milks came to market in January 2017. As of 2019, they had 11 varieties on the market.

Mitchell's father, William A. Mitchell, was a food scientist as well and inventor.

References

External links 
 Coverage of Mitchell and her work

21st-century American chemists
Year of birth missing (living people)
Living people
American food scientists
Food chemists
Texas A&M University alumni